John Carlo Bertot is a professor and co-director of the Information Policy & Access Center at the College of Information Studies at the University of Maryland, where he is also Associate Provost for Faculty Affairs.

Education 
Bertot received his Ph.D. from the School of Information Studies at Syracuse University.

Career 
Bertot served as an associate professor at the College of Information and as the director of the Information Institute at Florida State University (FSU) from 2001-2008. Before joining FSU, Bertot served on the faculty at the State University of New York at Albany.

According to the University of Maryland, Bertot served as editor of Government Information Quarterly from 2000-2015, and as co-editor/editor of The Library Quarterly from 2002-2014.  He joined the University of Maryland's iSchool faculty in August 2008, and before being named Associate Provost in 2015, he was the director of the iSchool’s MLS program from 2011- 2015. His research includes e-government, information and telecommunications policy, government agency technology planning and evaluation, and library planning and evaluation.  He has been conducting research concerning the Internet and public libraries since 1994.  In addition, Bertot also serves as co-editor of the Advances in Librarianship book series.

Bertot has received funding for his research from multiple organizations, including: the National Science Foundation, the Bill & Melinda Gates Foundation, the Government Accountability Office, the American Library Association, and the U.S. Institute of Museum and Library Services.

Bertot also spoke out in favor of the recent extensive renovations to the Enoch Pratt Free Library in Baltimore, Maryland led by former CEO and current Librarian of Congress, Carla Hayden, stating that the shift to the digital age was a shift in focus towards the surrounding community.  "You should be able to walk into the Pratt after the renovation and recognize its bones, but also say, 'Wow, this is a great space that allows me to do everything I have to do.' "

References

External links 
 Faculty page

Year of birth missing (living people)
Living people
American librarians
University of Maryland, College Park faculty
Syracuse University alumni